Phyllonorycter alpina is a moth of the family Gracillariidae. It is found from Germany to Italy and from France to Ukraine.

The larvae feed on Alnus viridis. They mine the leaves of their host plant. They create a lower-surface, long and narrow tentiform mine, usually between two lateral veins. The lower epidermis has one or more strong folds. The frass is deposited in a clump in the angle of the mine closest to the midrib. The cocoon is white and peppered with frass grains.

External links
bladmineerders.nl
Fauna Europaea

alpina
Moths of Europe
Moths described in 1856